Jehan d'Abundance (Pont-Saint-Esprit, ? – c.1540) is the pseudonym of a French poet and author of farces. He also signed his works with the pen names Maistre Tyburce or Tyburce Dyariferos. He wrote several moralities, mysteries and farces including La Cornette, his most famous work which Antoine du Verdier mentions in his  (Paris, 1773, vol. II, p. 325).

Works 
  10 May 1840. Rare book.
""

See also 
 French Renaissance literature

References

External links 

Wikisource

16th-century French poets
16th-century French dramatists and playwrights
People from Pont-Saint-Esprit
Year of birth missing
1540s deaths